Robert Glenn Etter (born August 8, 1945) is a former American college and professional football player who was a placekicker in the National Football League (NFL) and World Football League (WFL) for four seasons during the 1960s and 1970s.  He played college football for the University of Georgia.  He played professionally for the NFL's Atlanta Falcons in 1968 and 1969, and the Memphis Southmen of the WFL in 1974 and 1975.

Etter was born in Chattanooga, Tennessee.

Taught mathematics at California State University, Sacramento. Professor of Mathematics and Statistics. Emeritus (2010)

Bridge career
Etter is an American Contract Bridge League (ACBL) Grand Life Master. With nearly 19,000 lifetime masterpoints as of February 2015 he ranks 118th and about 90th among living Grand Masters. In 1981 and 1998 he won high-level  tournaments that are sometimes called "national championships" in the U.S.

Wins
 North American Bridge Championships (2)
 North American Swiss Teams (1) 1981
 Jacoby Open Swiss Teams (1) 1998

Runners-up
 North American Bridge Championships (4)
 North American Men's Swiss Teams (1) 1982
 Master Mixed Teams (1) 1986
 Open Pairs II (1) 2006
 NABC+ Fast Open Pairs (1) 2009

References

External links
Bob Etter at Pro Football Reference

1945 births
Living people
American contract bridge players
American football placekickers
Atlanta Falcons players
California State University, Sacramento faculty
Georgia Bulldogs football players
Memphis Southmen players
People from Chattanooga, Tennessee
Players of American football from Sacramento, California
Western Conference Pro Bowl players